Canyon is an unincorporated place on Canyon Lake on the Canyon River in Unorganized Kenora District in northwestern Ontario, Canada.

It lies on the Canadian National Railway transcontinental main line, between Favel to the west and McIntosh to the east, and Canyon served by Via Rail transcontinental Canadian trains.

References

Communities in Kenora District